EJ (formerly known as East Jordan Iron Works or EJIW) is a company headquartered in  East Jordan, Michigan. The company is a manufacturer and distributor of iron construction castings (Municipal castings), fabricated products, composite products, water distribution solutions, and other infrastructure access products for water, sewer, drainage, telecommunications, and utility networks worldwide. 

Products include:
 Manhole covers and frames
 Catch basin and curb inlet grates and frames
 Utility castings
 Trench grates
 Tree grates
 Detectable warning plates
 Airport and design specific castings
 Monument boxes
 Meter boxes
 Valve boxes
 Drainage grates
 Fire hydrants
 Gate valves
 Fabricated aluminum and steel products

EJ operates foundries in Elmira, Michigan, Ardmore, Oklahoma, and Picardie, France. 

Fabrication facilities are located in:
 Cicero, New York
 Youngstown, Ohio
 Tooele, Utah
 Birr, Ireland
 Ardennes, France
 Queensland, Australia

Water products manufacturing as well as the corporate headquarters are located in East Jordan, Michigan. Branches and distribution centers are located throughout the U.S., Canada, Europe, and Australia.

"EJ supplies products to infrastructure projects in 6 of the 7 continents." In 2007, the company was awarded the National Utility Contractors Association Associate of the year award.

History
EJ was founded in East Jordan, Michigan in 1883. The company was established in November 1883 by William Malpass and his father-in-law, Richard W. Round, to service the logging industry in East Jordan and around Northern Michigan. In the early years of operation, EJ manufactured castings for necessities such as machine parts, ship parts, agricultural uses, and railroads. In 1886, when William's brother James joined the business, the company was renamed to East Jordan Iron Works. In 1905, the foundry was destroyed by a fire but was then rebuilt using bricks made in its hometown of East Jordan.

In the 1920s, lumbering operations began to decrease after the advent of the Great Depression. By World War II, lumbering had moved out of the area, and EJ then shifted their large-scale production to street castings, water works valves, and fire hydrants as well as war materials needed for the war effort such as tank parts.

The Ardmore foundry was built in 2000 and opened in 2001. 

East Jordan Iron Works was renamed to EJ in 2012 to consolidate multiple owned holdings under a single brand.

Groundbreaking for a new EJ foundry in nearby Elmira Township began around the beginning of 2017, and was completed in November 2018. The company moved into the new building, and began operations in it shortly after. There is no timetable for the old foundry's demolition.

Construction of a new fabrication facility in Cicero, New York was completed in 2019.

EJ owns and operates three foundries, with locations in Elmira, Michigan; Ardmore, Oklahoma; and Picardy, France (acquired Norinco).  EJ also owns and operates sales offices and distribution centers.

Sales and products
EJ's main manufacturing facility, corporate headquarters, and hydrant & valve assembly lines are located in East Jordan. The foundry production facility in Ardmore also provides numerous castings for EJ sales operations. EJ is a producer and supplier of construction castings to hundreds of U.S. cities, townships, counties, and states. The EJ product line includes manhole frames and manhole covers, utility castings for the telecommunications industry, trench grates, tree grates, detectable warning plates, airport and design specific castings, monument boxes, meter boxes, valve boxes, drainage grates, curb inlets, and catch basins. EJ construction castings can be found in major metropolitan areas, as well as world-wide.

See also
Neenah Foundry

References

Steel companies of the United States
Manufacturing companies based in Michigan
Charlevoix County, Michigan
Manufacturing companies established in 1883
Industrial buildings and structures in Michigan